The tendons of certain animals (particularly beef tendon) are used as an ingredient in some Asian cuisines, including the Filipino, Chinese, Japanese, Korean, Indonesian, Thai, Laotian, Cambodian and Vietnamese traditions. Tendon is tough and fibrous, but becomes soft after a long period of cooking. In some cases it may be boiled for as long as eight hours, while in other dishes it is prepared by deep frying. It contains large amounts of collagen, and after boiling or stewing, it is sometimes described as mimicking the mouthfeel of high-fat cuts of beef despite its low fat content. One author described the taste of deep-fried tendon as being similar to chicharrón (fried pork belly).

Culinary uses

China 

Indonesia 
In Indonesian cuisine, bakso  is beef meatball filled with pieces of tendon, while soto  is spicy cow's trotters soup which includes cow's leg tendons. Another dish is mie kocok which is a noodle dish with meatballs, beansprouts and pieces of beef tendon.

Japan 
In Japanese cuisine, beef tendon is a common ingredient in oden.

Korea 
The most common way to eat beef tendon in Korea is steaming it with high pressure to serve it soft. The steamed beef tendons are eaten with green onions and soy sauce or sometimes served in ox bone soup.

Thailand 

Vietnam 
In Vietnamese cuisine, it is often used in pho.

Gallery

References

Cantonese cuisine
Dim sum
Japanese cuisine
Indonesian cuisine